A0, A-0, A0, or a0 may refer to:

 101 A0 and 103 A0, two versions of the German Heinkel Tourist moped
 A0 paper size, an international ISO 216 standard paper size (841 × 1189 mm), which results in an area very close to 1 m2
 A0 highway (Zimbabwe), a highway which orbits Zimbabwe
 A0, the lowest A (musical note) note on a standard piano
 A0, a climbing grade
 A00, Irregular chess openings code in the Encyclopaedia of Chess Openings
 A-0 Geyser, a geyser in Yellowstone National Park
 A-0 System, an early compiler related tool developed for electronic computers
 L'Avion, IATA airline designator for the French airline
 Characters of type A0, an older term for algebraic Hecke characters
 a0, the accepted mathematical symbol for the Bohr radius
 Haplogroup A00 and A0; see Y-chromosomal Adam  and Haplogroup A (Y-DNA)
 A0, a subdivision in stellar classification
 A0, sometimes written as 0xA0, is the hexadecimal representation of non-breaking space in various character encoding standards
 A0 road (Sri Lanka), an A-Grade road in Sri Lanka

Airplanes and rockets 
 A-0, a 1943 Pre-production model of the German Walter HWK 509 liquid-fuel bipropellant rocket engine
 A-0, a 1938 variant of the German Siebel Si 204 transport and trainer aircraft
 He 177 A-0, a pre-production series of the 1942 German Heinkel He 177 heavy bomber
 Hs 126A-0, a variant of the 1937 German Henschel Hs 126 reconnaissance aircraft
 Ju 87 A-0, a variant of the 1936 German Junkers Ju 87 dive bomber aircraft
 Me 210A-0, a pre-production variant of the 1943 German Messerschmitt Me 210 heavy fighter aircraft

Submarine 
 Isaac Peral (A-0), a Spanish submarine

See also 
 AO (disambiguation)